Laith Nakli (born December 1, 1969) is a British-Syrian-American actor and producer of Syrian descent best known for his role in the 2017 movie The Wall as the voice of the mythical sniper named Juba, the 2017 miniseries The Long Road Home and 2018 movie 12 Strong as Commander Ahmed Lal. His parents are from Syria.

Filmography

Film

Television

References

External links
 

1969 births
Living people
British expatriate male actors in the United States
English male film actors
English male television actors
20th-century English male actors
21st-century English male actors
English people of Syrian descent